The Red Springs Red Robins were a minor league baseball team based in Red Springs, North Carolina. From 1947 to 1950, the Red Springs Red Robins played exclusively as members of the Class D level Tobacco State League, hosting home games at Robbins Park. The Red Robins were a minor league affiliate of the Philadelphia Athletics from 1947 to 1950. The 1969 Red Springs Twins succeeded the Red Robins, playing as members of the Class A level Carolina League.

History 
Red Springs, North Carolina first hosted minor league play in 1947. The Red Springs Red Robins began play as members of the eight–team Class D level Tobacco State League as a minor league affiliate of the Philadelphia Athletics. The Clinton Blues, Dunn-Erwin Twins, Lumberton Cubs, Sanford Spinners, Smithfield-Selma Leafs, Warsaw Red Sox and Wilmington Pirates joined Red Springs in league play.

The Red Springs minor league franchise was formed in 1947. The league expanded from six to eight teams, adding the Lumberton Cubs and Red Springs as new members for the 1947 season. It was reported the president of the franchise was Connie Mack, with Arthur Ehlers serving as vice-president and business manager Tom Cope.

The Red Springs Red Robins' opening game was held on the road at the Lumberton Cubs on April 24, 1947. It was noted the Fairmont and Lumberton High School bands performed, as Reverend R.L. Alexander served as master of ceremonies. Lumberton Mayor “Rom” A. Hedgpeth addressed the 3,000 fans in attendance before the game. Red Springs then defeated Lumberton 14–3 in the opening game.

In their first season of play, the 1947 Red Springs Red Robins finished in 7th place. Playing in the eight–team league, Red Springs ended the regular season with a 47–78 record, playing under manager Red Norris, who would manage the team for three seasons, winning two championships. Red Springs finished the 1947 season 39.0 games behind the 1st place Sanford Spinners in the final regular season standings. The Red Springs Red Robins did not qualify for the playoffs in 1947, but proceeded to win league championships in 1948 and 1949.

In 1948, the Red Springs Red Robins were champions of the Class D level Tobacco State League. The Red Robins ended the regular season in 3rd place with an 75–62 record, playing under returning manager Red Norris. Red Springs finished 5.5 games behind the 1st placed Sanford Spinners in the final regular season standings. In the playoffs, the Red Robins defeated the Wilmington Pirates 4 games to 3 in the first round. In the Finals, the Red Springs Red Robins won the championship by defeating the Sanford Spinners 4 games to 1.

Red Springs defended their championship and won the 1949 Tobacco State League title. The Red Springs Red Robins placed 2rd in the eight–team league. The Red Robins finished the regular season with a record of 76–59, playing under manager Red Norris and finished 6.5 games behind the 1st place Dunn-Erwin Twins in the regular season standings. In the 1st round of the playoffs, Red Springs defeated the Sanford Spinners 4 games to 2 and advanced. In the Finals, the Red Robins won their second consecutive championship by defeating the Dunn-Erwin Twins 4 games to 1.

In their final season, the 1950 Red Springs Red Robins reportedly formed a partnership with nearby Laurinburg, North Carolina in Tobacco State League play. On July 12, 1950, in a notable game, John Gerace of the Lumberton Auctioneers threw a no-hitter in a 5–0 victory over the Red Robins. With a 68–61 regular season record, the Red Robins placed 3rd in the 1950 regular season standings, finishing 21.0 games behind the 1st place Lumberton Auctioneers in the final regular season standings. Led by manager Ducky Detweiler, the Red Robins proceeded to the playoffs, losing to the Sanford Spinners 4 games to 0. The Tobacco State League permanently folded following the 1950 season.

In 1969, minor league baseball returned to Red Springs, North Carolina for one season. The Red Springs Twins played the 1969 season as a minor league affiliate of the Minnesota Twins in the Class A level Carolina League.

Red Springs, North Carolina has not hosted another minor league team.

The ballpark
The Red Springs minor league teams were noted to have played home games at Robbins Park. The ballpark was reportedly owned by a local mill and had a capacity of 2,500, with filed dimensions (Left, Center, Right) of 350–395–350. The ballpark was noted to have been located on State Highway 72, near Porsha Road, Red Springs, North Carolina.

Timeline

Year–by–year records

Notable alumni

Ducky Detweiler (1950, MGR)
Bill Harrington (1949)

See also
Red Springs Red Robins players

References

External links
Baseball Reference

Defunct minor league baseball teams
Professional baseball teams in North Carolina
Defunct baseball teams in North Carolina
Baseball teams established in 1947
Baseball teams disestablished in 1950
Hoke County, North Carolina
Robeson County, North Carolina
Philadelphia Athletics minor league affiliates
Tobacco State League teams